Jean-Pierre Chantin is born in 1961, associated with the University of Lyon.  He specializes in the history of religion in France, including the Catholic Church and the role of new religious movements.  In 1998 his study of Jansenism was published by the University of Lyon.  In 2001 he was the chief editor of the Dictionary of the religious world in contemporary France, "The margins of the Christianity", published by Editions Beauchesne.  In 2004 he published a 157-page study on French sects from 1905 to 2000, asking: "disputes or religious innovations?" and in 2010 about "The French certified diet", Editions Beauchesne (director of collection Bibliothèque Beauchesne).

References
 Dominique AVON, L'Histoire religieuse contemporaine en France, Paris, La Découverte, 2022, p. 192-193.
Notice "Jean-Pierre CHANTIN" sur le site du LARHRA, http://larhra.ish-lyon.cnrs.fr/membre/114 

Living people
French historians of religion
Researchers of new religious movements and cults
French male non-fiction writers
Year of birth missing (living people)